Kuza Bandai (Lower Meadows)

Bara Bandai (برہ بانڈئ) is a village in Swat, Khyber Pakhtunkhwa, Pakistan, known as an area crossed by Alexander The Great during his invasion of the subcontinent.
The people of village Bara Bandai belong to subsection Naikpikhel of Yusufzai the biggest and largest tribe of Pashtun or Pakhtun tribes. It is one of the Provincially Administered Tribal Areas (PATA) of Pakistan.  The village contains a small series of mountains and a forest, residential area starting from meadows of mountainsand merge with river swat on right bank, a village market, vast land for crops, number of canals, and a part of the Swat river.  Mountains of the village include Usmani Sar, Kafar Ghat and Najia Top.

Etymology 
The village was re-named by Yusufzai Pakhtuns after capturing it. The name Bara means "Upper" and Bandai means "Meadow", hence was named Bara Bandai due to its locality. On the West side of Bara Bandai is the neighbouring village Kuza Bandai which means The Lower Meadow. The names were basically given by their greenery, comparing the distances of both villages from Mingora the main city of Swat Valley, and by comparing their distances from the upper hilly areas of Swat such as Kalam and Bahrain. The ancient names of these villages are not known as they are just mentioned by locations in old times books and scripts.

Location 
Bara Bandai is about 8 Kilometers away from Mingawara or Mingoara, the main city of Swat Valley and 10 Kilometers from Saidu Sharif
the Capital of the Yousufzai State of Swat (Princely State). Situated on the left bank (North side) of Suvastu or The River Swat and is important and one of the large village of Nikpikhel. Nikpikhel is a sub tribe of Akozai and Khudizai Yousufzai and their area stretches in North to Godamanai bordering directly with Dir district, Ningolai is on the East, Dadahara and Shamozai on the West. On the South side of Nikpikhel is The River Swat ([Suvastu]). 
Bara Bandai is about 80 Kilometers from Kalam, the famous tourist spot of North Pakistan. Bara Bandai comes under the PK-8 constituency of Khyber Pakhtunkhwa Provincial Assembly and NA-4 constituency of National Assembly of Pakistan.

postal code 19201

Division 
The village residential areas are divided into sub units called as Chams (Pashto: چم) or Mohallah. Some of the major sub units are. 
 Hafiz baba
 Ali khan khel
 Morragai (Miangano Cham)
 Kotkay.
 Sarkhana
 Shado khel.
 Haider khel (Originally this clans belong to shamozo area. they have migrated from maloch village in 1960.people know them as maloch wal here.)
 Malik Amir khan khel (Ghaznavids) and other Malik's residing near to chapolo Cham.
 Awdal Khel
 Mandanr khel
 Nasar Khel
 Adam  Khel
 Bocha Khel
 Chapolo (related to chapolo masjid which names after the tribe lived there named as "chapolo miagan")
 Saidu Bibi (named after the aunt of Wali Swat lived there. She was from Saidu Sharif and belongs to Royal family of swat).
 Matra.
 Sarhad Colony.
 Warsaky (Inhabited by Amir khan kheil (descendant of Muhammad Amir swad khan and Muhammad Ameen Shaheed) Mandanr khel, Miagan and shadokheil
 khamoosh colony.
 Bazar
 khona mohalla(territory of khona masjid)

Administration
The village is in uc bara bandai, tehsil kabal, district swat. It is further divided into two subunits (neighbourhood council) Bara Bandai(1) & Bara Bandai (2). Under local body election 2015 the administration came into power is Falak naz khan & Riaz Ahmed.

Photos

Population 
Total population of village Bara Bandai is 19374 (2009).Which makes it one of the largest villages in the Swat valley. There are number of sub-tribes (clans) Yusufzais  and Malik of yusazfzais living in the village. Some names of the tribes are,
Malik Amir khan khel
Awdal Khel, 
Shado khel,
Nasar Khel,
Mandanr khel,
Bucha Khel, 
Ajo khel,   
Haider khel(maloch wal), 
bara khan khel, 
alikhan khel, adam khel, and some of occupational and religious tribes.

Education 
The village consist of 1 high, 3 govt boys primary schools and 1 middle govt school for girls along with a number of schools in private sector.

Health 
Bara Bandai has its own Basic Health Unit(BHU), many clinical laboratories and number of clinics in private sector which provide health facilities to the residents.

Climate 
The weather of the village is cold in the winter season and moderate during summer. Snowfall in winter intensify its beauty.

Agriculture 
The village climate made it favorable for many crops and fruits. The village not only fulfill their own need but also supply its product to other areas. Among these onion and peach are commonly produce.

Notable figures 
Aimal khan (captain Pakistan volley ball team)

Shaykh Abu Eesa Niamatullah (UK based Islamic scholar)

References

External links
 Click here to visit-The Beauty of Bara Bandai Swat

Populated places in Swat District
All articles lacking reliable references